Patrick J. Lougheed (born 1937) is a former Irish Gaelic footballer. At club level he played with St. Finbarr's and was also a member of the Cork senior football team.

Playing career
Lougheed first played Gaelic football at underage levels with St. Finbarr's before joining the club's senior team. He won his first Cork SFC title as a substitute in 1956 before winning two titles on the field of play in 1957 and 1959. Lougheed captained the intermediate team to the Cork IFC title in 1970. He also lined out with the St. Finbarr's junior hurling team and 

Lougheed first appeared on the inter-county scene with Cork during an unsuccessful two-year stint with the minor team in 1954 and 1955. Success at club level saw him drafted onto the senior team and he made a number of appearances, as well as captaining the team, during the 1956-57 National League.

Coaching career
Lougheed first joined the St. Finbarr's senior team selection committee in 1968 and took over as coach in 1974. During his 14 seasons in that role, St. Finbarr's won five Cork SFC titles, three Munster SCFC titles and back-to-back All-Ireland Club Championships in 1980 and 1981. Lougheed vacated the post of trainer in 1988 but continued with the team as a selector until 1992 when he brought his 25-season management career to an end. He also served in a number of administrative positions with the club, including vice-chairman and president.

Honours

Player

St. Finbarr's
Cork Senior Football Championship: 1956, 1957, 1959
Cork Intermediate Football Championship: 1970 (c)

Coach

St. Finbarr's
All-Ireland Senior Club Football Championship: 1980, 1981
Munster Senior Club Football Championship: 1979, 1980, 1982
Cork Senior Football Championship: 1976, 1979, 1980, 1982, 1985

References

1937 births
Living people
Cork inter-county Gaelic footballers
Dual players
Gaelic football coaches
Gaelic football selectors
St Finbarr's Gaelic footballers
St Finbarr's hurlers